Valgejärv refers to several lakes in Estonia:

 Riisipere Valgejärv, Saue Parish, Hiiu County
 Kurtna Valgejärv, Alutaguse Parish, Ida-Viru County

See also
 Valgjärv (disambiguation)